The Louis J. Adams House is a historic house located in Silverton in Marion County, Oregon. It was listed on the National Register of Historic Places in 2011.

It is a prominent building in Silverton.  It is a Craftsman architecture house that is deemed an "outstanding example" of the style.  It is one of three houses in Silverton listed in the same day.

See also
Murton E. and Lillian DeGuire House
June D. Drake House

References

National Register of Historic Places in Marion County, Oregon
Silverton, Oregon
1912 establishments in Oregon
Houses in Marion County, Oregon